The Men's 200m T11 had its first round held on September 11, beginning at 10:00. The Semifinals were held on September 12, at 17:25 and the A and B Finals were held on September 13 at 10:47.

Medalists

Results

References
Round 1 - Heat 1
Round 1 - Heat 2
Round 1 - Heat 3
Round 1 - Heat 4
Round 1 - Heat 5
Semifinals - Heat 1
Semifinals - Heat 2
Semifinals - Heat 3
Final A
Final B

Athletics at the 2008 Summer Paralympics